The fifth series of the BBC espionage television series Spooks began broadcasting on 17 September 2006 before ending on 13 November 2006. The series consists of ten episodes. Ruth Evershed left after episode 5; the actor playing the part, Nicola Walker was expecting her first child.

Cast
Main
 Rupert Penry-Jones as Adam Carter
 Hermione Norris as Ros Myers
 Raza Jaffrey as Zafar Younis
 Miranda Raison as Jo Portman
 Hugh Simon as Malcolm Wynn-Jones
 Rory MacGregor as Colin Wells (episode 1)
with Nicola Walker as Ruth Evershed (episode 1–5)
and Peter Firth as Harry Pearce

Guests
 Gugu Mbatha-Raw as Jenny
James Dicker as Wes Carter
 Anna Chancellor as Juliet Shaw
 Robert Glenister as Nicholas Blake (episodes 1 & 2)
 Lindsay Duncan as Angela Wells (episode 1)
 Ofo Uhiara as Michael Johnson
 Tim McInnerny as Oliver Mace
 Saskia Reeves as Sally Bernard
 Matt Day as Neil Sternin
 Phyllis Logan as Diana Jewell

Episodes

Notes

References

External links
 

2006 British television seasons
Spooks (TV series)